INS Tanin is an Israeli Dolphin 2-class submarine.  The name means "crocodile" in modern Hebrew, but can also mean the sea monster "tannin". The submarine was launched in February 2012 in Kiel, Germany, and was delivered to the Israeli port city Haifa later that year, and entered service in 2014.

References

External links

 Israeli submarine Dolphin
 FAS: Israel: Submarines
 Dolphin class submarines cutaway diagram, Der Spiegel, 5 June 2012

Dolphin-class submarines
Attack submarines
 
Ships built in Kiel
2012 ships